Laguépie is a commune in the Tarn-et-Garonne department in the Occitanie region in southern France.

Laguépie is situated at the confluence of the rivers Aveyron and Viaur and at the tri-point of the departments Tarn-et-Garonne, Aveyron and Tarn. On the opposite, left bank of the Viaur is the village Saint-Martin-Laguépie, which is in the Tarn department. Historically part of the province of Rouergue (now the Aveyron department), Laguépie was added to Tarn-et-Garonne in 1808. Laguépie station has rail connections to Toulouse, Figeac and Aurillac.

See also
Communes of the Tarn-et-Garonne department

References

Communes of Tarn-et-Garonne